Graze (stylised as graze) is a United Kingdom-based snack company which is owned by Unilever. Graze offers over 200 snack combinations through snack subscription boxes, an online shop and retailers. The company distributes thousands of snack boxes per day across the UK. Graze expanded operations to include the United States in 2013, launching snacks into US retailers in 2016.

Graze includes sweet and savoury snacks. Many of the products are suitable for vegans.

History 
Graze was launched in 2008 by seven friends brought together by Graham Bosher, the founder of LoveFilm. The company began delivering snacks including nuts, small puddings, and porridge across the United Kingdom. In November 2012, The Carlyle Group purchased the majority stake of Graze.

Graze opened a distribution center in New Jersey in January 2013 to begin beta trials in the United States. Graze officially expanded into the United States by late 2013 and has offices in Jersey City, New Jersey and Manhattan, New York. By the end of 2014, Graze had generated £68 million in revenue. In February 2017, Graze reported £75.8 million in revenue for the year. As of September 2017, Graze was available in 7,500 stores across the United States.

Graze announced the launch of a line of snack products to UK retailers including Sainsbury's, Boots UK, and WHSmith in July 2015.

In 2015, Graze was listed as a member of the Sunday Times Fast Track 100, the list of Britain's top 100 fastest growing companies.

In 2016, Graze launched an online shop for one-off purchases, outside the snack subscription model, and began selling a range of their snacks in Walgreens stores across the US.

In February 2019, Graze was acquired by Unilever.

In August 2019, Graze subscribers in the US were notified that delivery on their subscriptions would end in September.  As of September 2019, the Graze website store showed no products available for sale and no pending orders and by December 2019 it had reverted to a UK only website.  The company has made no public announcement of why they have ceased business operations in the US.

Production 
Graze uses an algorithm called DARWIN (Decision Algorithm Rating What Ingredient's Next) to customize snack boxes based on the preferences subscribers enter on the site. Graze develops its own recipes that do not include genetically engineered ingredients, artificial flavors or colors, high fructose corn syrup, or trans fats.
Variety boxes contain four or eight snacks and can be delivered weekly, biweekly, or monthly. Larger sharing bags and multipacks are available to buy ad-hoc on graze's online shop 

Graze donates a portion of its profits from referrals to the Graze School of Farming charity, an organization that works to reduce global poverty through the Graze School of Farming in Kabubbu, Uganda. The farm teaches students how to farm and maintain fruit trees in order to help bring income to families living in poverty.

References 

Companies based in the London Borough of Richmond upon Thames
Food and drink companies established in 2008
Catering and food service companies of the United Kingdom
Snack food manufacturers of the United Kingdom
Subscription services
British companies established in 2008